Palak Jain (born 1 April 1994) is an Indian television actress known for roles in television programmes such as Sunaina - Mera Sapna Sach Hua and Veer Shivaji. Since July 2012, she has been portraying the role of Panchi Rastogi in Channel V India's The Buddy Project, opposite Kunal Jaisingh. She was also a part of the Sony TV serial Itna Karo Na Mujhe Pyar in 2015, followed by Ek Duje Ke Vaaste in 2016. She also played role of Jhanvi in the serial Laado 2.

Career
Jain started acting and modelling at the age of 6, participating in numerous commercials. She was also an uncredited cast member of a few films as a child artist.

Jain made her television debut in the Pogo TV drama Sunaina- Mera Sapna Sach Hua, as the protagonist Sunaina Mathur, a teenage girl whose dreams literally come true. She then went on to play Saibai in the historical series, Veer Shivaji opposite her co-star, Paras Arora. This was followed by a cameo as Shreya in Crime Patrol. 

Jain's next major television role was Panchi Rastogi, the female protagonist of The Buddy Project.

Filmography

Television

Films

References

External links

Living people
Indian television actresses
Indian soap opera actresses
Actresses from Mumbai
Indian film actresses
Actresses in Hindi cinema
21st-century Indian actresses
1994 births